Airport Circle can refer to the following traffic circles:
Airport Circle (Newark) in Newark, New Jersey (defunct)
Airport Circle (Pennsauken) in Pennsauken Township, New Jersey
Airport Circle (Pomona) in Pomona, New Jersey